The Black Face is a 1921 German silent film directed by Franz Osten.

It was made at the Emelka Studios in Munich.

Cast
 Emil Fenyő
 Irma Gerold
 Fritz Greiner
 Mara Tchoukleva

References

Bibliography

External links

1921 films
Films of the Weimar Republic
Films directed by Franz Osten
German silent feature films
German black-and-white films